Richard Gaisford is a British journalist for ITV. He has worked on ITV Breakfast programmes since 2000, initially at GMTV. He joined GMTV's successor Daybreak in 2010, continuing in the role of Chief Correspondent. He continued the role into Good Morning Britain from 2014, as well as being an occasional relief newsreader on the programme. Richard occasionally reports for the ITV Lunchtime News.

In 2011, Gaisford was chosen to travel with Prince William and Kate Middleton to Canada on their first Royal Tour. Gaisford reported on the funerals of Pope John Paul II and Nelson Mandela. Gaisford also anchored coverage of the 2008 Olympics from Beijing and reported from South Africa during the World Cup in 2010 for GMTV.

He broadcast live from the devastated cities close to Fukushima, having previously reported from Thailand and Indonesia following the 2004 Indian Ocean earthquake and tsunami.

Filmography
Television

Personal life
His brother (Steve Gaisford) is also a journalist.

External links
 About Richard Gaisford

1972 births
British television journalists
Date of birth missing (living people)
ITV people
Living people